Qeshlaq-e Madadlu (also Romanized as Qeshlāq-e Madadlū) is a village in Garamduz Rural District, Garamduz District, Khoda Afarin County, East Azerbaijan Province, Iran. At the 2006 census, its population was 107, in 28 families.

References 

Populated places in Khoda Afarin County